Rudolf Joseph Rufer (October 28, 1926 – October 25, 2010) was a professional baseball player. He played in 26 games in Major League Baseball between the 1949 and 1950 seasons for the New York Giants, primarily as a shortstop.

Rufer spent two years of his four-year college baseball career playing at Dartmouth College and the other two at the University of Oklahoma. He also played for the minor league Wilmington Blue Rocks, for whom he still holds many team records.

Rufer resided in Malverne, New York, and was father to seven children. For twenty five years he was a scout for the Los Angeles Dodgers.

References

External links

1926 births
2010 deaths
Baseball players from New York (state)
Elmira Pioneers players
Fort Worth Cats players
Jersey City Giants players
Los Angeles Dodgers scouts
Major League Baseball shortstops
Minneapolis Millers (baseball) players
Mobile Bears players
Minor league baseball managers
New York Giants (NL) players
Oakland Oaks (baseball) players
St. Paul Saints (AA) players
Thomasville Dodgers players
Tulsa Oilers (baseball) players
Wilmington Blue Rocks (1940–1952) players
People from Ridgewood, Queens
People from Malverne, New York
People from Lynbrook, New York